Valentin Konstantinovich Turkin (6 February 1887 – 10 January 1958) was a screenwriter, film critic, and film theorist active in the Soviet Union.

Turkin was a founder of the Gerasimov Institute of Cinematography.

Selected filmography
 The Tailor from Torzhok (1925)
The Stationmaster (1925)
The Girl with a Hatbox (1927)
The Ghost That Never Returns (1930)

References

Bibliography
 Youngblood, Denise. Movies for the Masses: Popular Cinema and Soviet Society in the 1920s. Cambridge University Press, 1993.

External links

1887 births
1958 deaths
Male screenwriters
People from Novocherkassk
Film theorists
Soviet film critics
Soviet screenwriters
Recipients of the Order of the Red Banner of Labour
Academic staff of the Gerasimov Institute of Cinematography